The Alliance for Shared Values (AfSV) is a New York-based 501(c)(3) nonprofit umbrella organization and major part of the Gülen movement, or Hizmet.

Goals and organization 
Having been inspired by Turkish preacher Fethullah Gülen, their stated goal is to "[serve] as a voice for civic, culture and service organizations around the U.S dedicated to promoting community service, education and interfaith dialogue." The president of the organization is Alp Aslandogan.

Member groups 
According to the official website, the following groups are a part of the Alliance for Shared Values (AFSV):
 Atlantic Institute, formerly known as the Istanbul Cultural Center, a non-profit group from Greenville, Columbia, Charleston, Clemson South Carolina that "promotes dialogue between different faiths, cultures and religions." AI holds a free annual iftar (the evening meal at which Muslims end their daily fast during Ramadan), where non-Muslims can learn about the Muslim Ramadan traditions and have their questions answered by the institute. Similarly, it organizes cultural interfaith events in South Carolina. The institute also occasionally paid for trips to Turkey for legislators in South Carolina. Its president and director is Akif Aydin.
 Rumi Forum, formed in 1999 and based in Washington, D.C., exists to “foster interfaith and intercultural dialogue.” In April 2016, they hosted a religious extremism debate in Charlottesville, Virginia. In June 2016, they hosted an iftar similar to that of the Atlantic Institute in Albemarle County, Virginia.

 Pacifica Institute, a nationwide nonprofit organization which opened in the San Fernando Valley in California in 2003, but which is now based in South Salt Lake, Utah. In February 2015, the institute sponsored and hosted a screening of "Love is a Verb", a documentary on Fethullah Gulen's life. The Pacifica Institute traditionally had annual trips to Turkey, but these stopped in early 2016 because of instability in the area and the increase in ISIS-fueled terrorist attacks. The institute, like the other member groups of the AFSV, also holds interfaith iftars.
 Institute for Interfaith Dialogue (or Dialogue Institute of the Southwest, its new official name), based in Houston.
 Niagara Foundation. A non-profit organization dedicated to the mission of fostering civic conversations and sustained relationships between people of different cultures and faiths.
 Peace Islands Institute (formerly Interfaith Dialog Center)

Conflict with Turkey's Recep Tayyip Erdoğan 
In 2014, the AFSV released a statement in which they condemned what they called "politically-motivated attempts to crackdown [sic] on law-abiding citizens" by then-Prime Minister of Turkey Recep Tayyip Erdoğan against members of the organization, including defaming Gülen and demanding his extradition without any charges or legal case against him. They also accused him of taking advantage of Turkey's strategic relationship with the United States.

In 2016, Turkish President Erdoğan and other members of the Turkish government blamed Fethullah Gülen and his movement for the Turkish coup attempt. The AFSV condemned both the coup and accusations of being involved in it, releasing a statement on the day of the attempt:

References

External links

 

Non-profit organizations based in New York (state)
Gülen movement
Interfaith organizations
Sufi organizations